The 1890 Melbourne Cup was a two-mile handicap horse race which took place on Tuesday, 4 November 1890.

This was the largest ever cup field with 39 runners. It was trainer Walter Hickenbotham's second out of four cup wins. The winner, Carbine, carried the top weight of 10 st 5 lb (65.75 kg).

The placegetters were:

See also

 Melbourne Cup
 List of Melbourne Cup winners
 Victoria Racing Club

References

External links
1890 Melbourne Cup footyjumpers.com

1890
Melbourne Cup
Melbourne Cup
19th century in Melbourne
1890s in Melbourne